An image scanner—often abbreviated to just scanner—is a device that optically scans images, printed text, handwriting or an object and converts it to a digital image. Commonly used in offices are variations of the desktop flatbed scanner where the document is placed on a glass window for scanning. Hand-held scanners, where the device is moved by hand, have evolved from text scanning "wands" to 3D scanners used for industrial design, reverse engineering, test and measurement, orthotics, gaming and other applications. Mechanically driven scanners that move the document are typically used for large-format documents, where a flatbed design would be impractical.

Modern scanners typically use a charge-coupled device (CCD) or a contact image sensor (CIS) as the image sensor, whereas drum scanners, developed earlier and still used for the highest possible image quality, use a photomultiplier tube (PMT) as the image sensor. A rotary scanner, used for high-speed document scanning, is a type of drum scanner that uses a CCD array instead of a photomultiplier. Non-contact planetary scanners essentially photograph delicate books and documents. All these scanners produce two-dimensional images of subjects that are usually flat, but sometimes solid; 3D scanners produce information on the three-dimensional structure of solid objects.

Digital cameras can be used for the same purposes as dedicated scanners. When compared to a true scanner, a camera image is subject to a degree of distortion, reflections, shadows, low contrast, and blur due to camera shake (reduced in cameras with image stabilization). Resolution is sufficient for less demanding applications. Digital cameras offer advantages of speed, portability and non-contact digitizing of thick documents without damaging the book spine. In 2010 scanning technologies were combining 3D scanners with digital cameras to create full-color, photo-realistic 3D models of objects.

Scans are usually downloaded by a computer the unit is attached to. Some scanners are able to store scans on standalone flash media (e.g. memory cards and USB sticks).

In the biomedical research area, detection devices for DNA microarrays are called scanners as well. These scanners are high-resolution systems (up to 1 µm/ pixel), similar to microscopes. The detection is done via CCD or a photomultiplier tubes.

History of scanners

Modern scanners are considered the successors of early telephotography and fax input devices.

The pantelegraph (Italian: pantelegrafo; French: pantélégraphe) was an early form of facsimile machine transmitting over normal telegraph lines developed by Giovanni Caselli, used commercially in the 1860s, that was the first such device to enter practical service. It used electromagnets to drive and synchronize movement of pendulums at the source and the distant location, to scan and reproduce images. It could transmit handwriting, signatures, or drawings within an area of up to 150 × 100 mm.

Édouard Belin's Belinograph of 1913, scanned using a photocell and transmitted over ordinary phone lines, formed the basis for the AT&T Wirephoto service. In Europe, services similar to a wirephoto were called a Belino. It was used by news agencies from the 1920s to the mid-1990s, and consisted of a rotating drum with a single photodetector at a standard speed of 60 or 120 rpm (later models up to 240 rpm). They send a linear analog AM signal through standard telephone voice lines to receptors, which synchronously print the proportional intensity on special paper. Color photos were sent as three separated RGB filtered images consecutively, but only for special events due to transmission costs.

Types

Drum

Drum scanners capture image information with photomultiplier tubes (PMT), rather than the charge-coupled device (CCD) arrays found in flatbed scanners and inexpensive film scanners. "Reflective and transmissive originals are mounted on an acrylic cylinder, the scanner drum, which rotates at high speed while it passes the object being scanned in front of precision optics that deliver image information to the PMTs. Modern color drum scanners use three matched PMTs, which read red, blue, and green light, respectively. Light from the original artwork is split into separate red, blue, and green beams in the optical bench of the scanner with dichroic filters." Photomultipliers offer superior dynamic range and for this reason drum scanners can extract more detail from very dark shadow areas of a transparency than flatbed scanners using CCD sensors. The smaller dynamic range of the CCD sensors, versus photomultiplier tubes, can lead to loss of shadow detail, especially when scanning very dense transparency film. While mechanics vary by manufacturer, most drum scanners pass light from halogen lamps though a focusing system to illuminate both reflective and transmissive originals.

The drum scanner gets its name from the clear acrylic cylinder, the drum, on which the original artwork is mounted for scanning. "One of the unique features of drum scanners is the ability to control sample area and aperture size independently. The sample size is the area that the scanner encoder reads to create an individual pixel. The aperture is the actual opening that allows light into the optical bench of the scanner. The ability to control aperture and sample size separately are particularly useful for smoothing film grain when scanning black-and-white and color negative originals."

While drum scanners are capable of scanning both reflective and transmissive artwork, a good-quality flatbed scanner can produce good scans from reflective artwork. As a result, drum scanners are rarely used to scan prints now that high-quality, inexpensive flatbed scanners are readily available. Film, however, is where drum scanners continue to be the tool of choice for high-end applications. Because film can be wet-mounted to the scanner drum, which enhances sharpness and masks dust and scratches, and because of the exceptional sensitivity of the PMTs, drum scanners are capable of capturing very subtle details in film originals.

The situation  was that only a few companies continued to manufacture and service drum scanners. While prices of both new and used units dropped from the start of the 21st century, they were still much more costly than CCD flatbed and film scanners. Image quality produced by flatbed scanners had improved to the degree that the best ones were suitable for many graphic-arts operations, and they replaced drum scanners in many cases as they were less expensive and faster. However, drum scanners with their superior resolution (up to 24,000 PPI), color gradation, and value structure continued to be used for scanning images to be enlarged, and for museum-quality archiving of photographs and print production of high-quality books and magazine advertisements. As second-hand drum scanners became more plentiful and less costly, many fine-art photographers acquired them.

Flatbed

This type of scanner is sometimes called a reflective scanner because it works by shining white light onto the object to be scanned and reading the intensity and color of light that is reflected from it, usually a line at a time. They are designed for scanning prints or other flat, opaque materials but some have available transparency adapters, which for a number of reasons, in most cases, are not very well suited to scanning film.

CCD scanner
"A flatbed scanner is usually composed of a glass pane (or platen), under which there is a bright light (often xenon, LED or cold cathode fluorescent) which illuminates the pane, and a moving optical array in CCD scanning. CCD-type scanners typically contain three rows (arrays) of sensors with red, green, and blue filters."

CIS scanner

Contact image sensor (CIS) scanning consists of a moving set of red, green and blue LEDs strobed for illumination and a connected monochromatic photodiode array under a rod lens array for light collection. "Images to be scanned are placed face down on the glass, an opaque cover is lowered over it to exclude ambient light, and the sensor array and light source move across the pane, reading the entire area. An image is therefore visible to the detector only because of the light it reflects. Transparent images do not work in this way, and require special accessories that illuminate them from the upper side. Many scanners offer this as an option."

Film

This type of scanner is sometimes called a slide or transparency scanner and it works by passing a narrowly focused beam of light through the film and reading the intensity and color of the light that emerges. "Usually, uncut film strips of up to six frames, or four mounted slides, are inserted in a carrier, which is moved by a stepper motor across a lens and CCD sensor inside the scanner. Some models are mainly used for same-size scans. Film scanners vary a great deal in price and quality." The lowest-cost dedicated film scanners can be had for less than $50 and they might be sufficient for modest needs. From there they inch up in staggered levels of quality and advanced features upward of five figures. "The specifics vary by brand and model and the end results are greatly determined by the level of sophistication of the scanner's optical system and, equally important, the sophistication of the scanning software."

Roller scanner

Scanners are available that pull a flat sheet over the scanning element between rotating rollers. They can only handle single sheets up to a specified width (typically about 210 mm, the width of many printed letters and documents), but can be very compact, just requiring a pair of narrow rollers between which the document is passed. Some are portable, powered by batteries and with their own storage, eventually transferring stored scans to a computer over a USB or other interface.

3D scanner

3D scanners collect data on the three-dimensional shape and appearance of an object.

Planetary scanner

Planetary scanners scan a delicate object without physical contact.

Hand

Hand scanners are moved over the subject to be imaged by hand. There are two different types: document and 3D scanners.

Hand document scanner

Hand-held document scanners are manual devices that are dragged across the surface of the image to be scanned by hand. Scanning documents in this manner requires a steady hand, as an uneven scanning rate produces distorted images; an indicator light on the scanner indicates if motion is too fast. They typically have a "start" button, which is held by the user for the duration of the scan; some switches to set the optical resolution; and a roller, which generates a clock pulse for synchronization with the computer. Older hand scanners were monochrome, and produced light from an array of green LEDs to illuminate the image"; later ones scan in monochrome or color, as desired. A hand scanner may have a small window through which the document being scanned could be viewed. In the early 1990s many hand scanners had a proprietary interface module specific to a particular type of computer, such as an Atari ST or Commodore Amiga. Since the introduction of the USB standard, it is the interface most commonly used. As hand scanners are much narrower than most normal document or book sizes, software (or the end user) needed to combine several narrow "strips" of scanned document to produce the finished article.

Inexpensive portable battery-powered "glide-over" hand scanners, typically capable of scanning an area as wide as a normal letter and much longer remain available .

Hand 3D scanner
Handheld 3D scanners are used in industrial design, reverse engineering, inspection and analysis, digital manufacturing and medical applications. "To compensate for the uneven motion of the human hand, most 3D scanning systems rely on the placement of reference markers, typically adhesive reflective tabs that the scanner uses to align elements and mark positions in space."

Portable
Image scanners are usually used in conjunction with a computer which controls the scanner and stores scans. Small portable scanners, either roller-fed or "glide-over" hand-operated, operated by batteries and with storage capability, are available for use away from a computer; stored scans can be transferred later. Many can scan both small documents such as business cards and till receipts, and letter-sized documents.

Keyboard document scanner 

A document scanner embedded inside a computer keyboard makes it available when needed yet taking no extra space since it is built inside the computer keyboard.

Smartphone scanner app
The higher-resolution cameras fitted to some smartphones can produce reasonable quality document scans by taking a photograph with the phone's camera and post-processing it with a scanning app, a range of which are available for most phone operating systems, to whiten the background of a page, correct perspective distortion so that the shape of a rectangular document is corrected, convert to black-and-white, etc. Many such apps can scan multiple-page documents with successive camera exposures and output them either as a single file or multiple page files. Some smartphone scanning apps can save documents directly to online storage locations, such as Dropbox and Evernote, send via email or fax documents via email-to-fax gateways.

Smartphone scanner apps can be broadly divided into three categories:
 Document scanning apps primarily designed to handle documents and output PDF, and sometimes JPEG, files
 Photo scanning apps that output JPEG files, and have editing functions useful for photo rather than document editing;
 Barcode-like QR code scanning apps that then search the internet for information associated with the code.

Scan quality 
Color scanners typically read RGB (red-green-blue color) data from the array. This data is then processed with some proprietary algorithm to correct for different exposure conditions, and sent to the computer via the device's input/output interface (usually USB, previous to which was SCSI or bidirectional parallel port in older units).

Color depth varies depending on the scanning array characteristics, but is usually at least 24 bits. High quality models have 36-48 bits of color depth.

Another qualifying parameter for a scanner is its resolution, measured in pixels per inch (ppi), sometimes more accurately referred to as Samples per inch (spi). Instead of using the scanner's true optical resolution, the only meaningful parameter, manufacturers like to refer to the interpolated resolution, which is much higher thanks to software interpolation. , a high-end flatbed scanner can scan up to 5400 ppi and drum scanners have an optical resolution of between 3,000 and 24,000 ppi.

"Effective resolution" is the true resolution of a scanner, and is determined by using a resolution test chart.  The effective resolution of most all consumer flatbed scanners is considerably lower than the manufactures' given optical resolution.  Example is the Epson V750 Pro with an optical resolution given by manufacturer as being 4800dpi and 6400dpi (dual lens), but tested "According to this we get a resolution of only about 2300 dpi - that's just 40% of the claimed resolution!"  Dynamic range is claimed to be 4.0 Dmax, but "Regarding the density range of the Epson Perfection V750 Pro, which is indicated as 4.0, one must say that here it doesn't reach the high-quality [of] film scanners either."

Manufacturers often claim interpolated resolutions as high as 19,200 ppi; but such numbers carry little meaningful value, because the number of possible interpolated pixels is unlimited and doing so does not increase the level of captured detail.

The size of the file created increases with the square of the resolution; doubling the resolution quadruples the file size. A resolution must be chosen that is within the capabilities of the equipment, preserves sufficient detail, and does not produce a file of excessive size. The file size can be reduced for a given resolution by using "lossy" compression methods such as JPEG, at some cost in quality. If the best possible quality is required lossless compression should be used; reduced-quality files of smaller size can be produced from such an image when required (e.g., image designed to be printed on a full page, and a much smaller file to be displayed as part of a fast-loading web page).

Purity can be diminished by scanner noise, optical flare, poor analog to digital conversion, scratches, dust, Newton's rings, out of focus sensors, improper scanner operation, and poor software. Drum scanners are said to produce the purest digital representations of the film, followed by high end film scanners that use the larger Kodak Tri-Linear sensors.

The third important parameter for a scanner is its density range (Dynamic Range) or Drange (see Densitometry). A high density range means that the scanner is able to record shadow details and brightness details in one scan. Density of film is measured on a base 10 log scale and varies between 0.0 (transparent) and 5.0, about 16 stops.  Density range is the space taken up in the 0 to 5 scale, and Dmin and Dmax denote where the least dense and most dense measurements on a negative or positive film. The density range of negative film is up to 3.6d, while slide film dynamic range is 2.4d.  Color negative density range after processing is 2.0d thanks to compression of the 12 stops into a small density range.  Dmax will be the densest on slide film for shadows, and densest on negative film for highlights.  Some slide films can have a Dmax close to 4.0d with proper exposure, and so can black-and-white negative film.

Consumer-level flatbed photo scanners have a dynamic range in the 2.0–3.0 range, which can be inadequate for scanning all types of photographic film, as Dmax can be and often is between 3.0d and 4.0d with traditional black-and-white film. Color film compresses its 12 stops of a possible 16 stops (film latitude) into just 2.0d of space via the process of dye coupling and removal of all silver from the emulsion.  Kodak Vision 3 has 18 stops.  So, color negative film scans the easiest of all film types on the widest range of scanners. Because traditional black-and-white film retains the image creating silver after processing, density range can be almost twice that of color film.  This makes scanning traditional black-and-white film more difficult and requires a scanner with at least a 3.6d dynamic range, but also a Dmax between 4.0d to 5.0d. High-end (photo lab) flatbed scanners can reach a dynamic range of 3.7, and Dmax around 4.0d. Dedicated film scanners  have a dynamic range between 3.0d–4.0d.  Office document scanners can have a dynamic range of less than 2.0d. Drum scanners have a dynamic range of 3.6–4.5.

By combining full-color imagery with 3D models, modern hand-held scanners are able to completely reproduce objects electronically. The addition of 3D color printers enables accurate miniaturization of these objects, with applications across many industries and professions.

For scanner apps, the scan quality is highly dependent on the quality of the phone camera and on the framing chosen by the user of the app.

Computer connection 

Scans must virtually always be transferred from the scanner to a computer or information storage system for further processing or storage. There are two basic issues: (1) how the scanner is physically connected to the computer and (2) how the application retrieves the information from the scanner.

Direct physical connection to a computer 
Scanned files must be transferred and stored. Scanners can generate this volume of data in a matter of seconds, making a fast connection desirable.

Scanners communicate to their host computer using one of the following physical interfaces, listing roughly from slow to fast:
 Parallel port - Connecting through a parallel port is the slowest common transfer method. Early scanners had parallel port connections that could not transfer data faster than 70 kilobytes/second. The primary advantage of the parallel port connection was economic and user skill level: it avoided adding an interface card to the computer.
 GPIB - General Purpose Interface Bus. Certain drumscanners like the Howtek D4000 featured both a SCSI and GPIB interface. The latter conforms to the IEEE-488 standard, introduced in the mid 1970s. The GPIB interface has only been used by a few scanner manufacturers, mostly serving the DOS/Windows environment. For Apple Macintosh systems, National Instruments provided a NuBus GPIB interface card.
 Small Computer System Interface (SCSI), rarely used since the early 21st century, supported only by computers with a SCSI interface, either on a card or built-in. During the evolution of the SCSI standard, speeds increased. Widely available and easily set up USB and Firewire largely supplanted SCSI.
 Universal Serial Bus (USB) scanners can transfer data quickly. The early USB 1.1 standard could transfer data at 1.5 megabytes per second (slower than SCSI), but the later USB 2.0/3.0 standards can transfer at more than 20/60 megabytes per second in practice.
 FireWire, or IEEE-1394, is an interface of comparable speed to USB 2.0. Possible FireWire speeds are 25, 50, and 100, 400 and 800 megabits per second, but devices may not support all speeds.
 Proprietary interfaces were used on some early scanners that used a proprietary interface card rather than a standard interface.

Indirect (network) connection to a computer 
During the early 1990s professional flatbed scanners were available over a local computer network. This proved useful to publishers, print shops, etc. This functionality largely fell out of use as the cost of flatbed scanners reduced enough to make sharing unnecessary.

From 2000 all-in-one multi-purpose devices became available which were suitable for both small offices and consumers, with printing, scanning, copying, and fax capability in a single apparatus which can be made available to all members of a workgroup.

Battery-powered portable scanners store scans on internal memory; they can later be transferred to a computer either by direct connection, typically USB, or in some cases a memory card may be removed from the scanner and plugged into the computer.

Applications Programming Interface 
A paint application such as GIMP or Adobe Photoshop must communicate with the scanner. There are many different scanners, and many of those scanners use different protocols. In order to simplify applications programming, some Applications programming interfaces ("API") were developed. The API presents a uniform interface to the scanner. This means that the application does not need to know the specific details of the scanner in order to access it directly. For example, Adobe Photoshop supports the TWAIN standard; therefore in theory Photoshop can acquire an image from any scanner that has a TWAIN driver.

In practice, there are often problems with an application communicating with a scanner. Either the application or the scanner manufacturer (or both) may have faults in their implementation of the API.

Typically, the API is implemented as a dynamically linked library. Each scanner manufacturer provides software that translates the API procedure calls into primitive commands that are issued to a hardware controller (such as the SCSI, USB, or FireWire controller). The manufacturer's part of the API is commonly called a device driver, but that designation is not strictly accurate: the API does not run in kernel mode and does not directly access the device. Rather the scanner API library translates application requests into hardware requests.

Common scanner software API interfaces:

SANE (Scanner Access Now Easy) is a free/open-source API for accessing scanners. Originally developed for Unix and Linux operating systems, it has been ported to OS/2, Mac OS X, and Microsoft Windows. Unlike TWAIN, SANE does not handle the user interface. This allows batch scans and transparent network access without any special support from the device driver.

TWAIN is used by most scanners. Originally used for low-end and home-use equipment, it is now widely used for large-volume scanning.

ISIS (Image and Scanner Interface Specification) created by Pixel Translations, which still uses SCSI-II for performance reasons, is used by large, departmental-scale, machines.

WIA (Windows Image Acquisition) is an API provided by Microsoft for use on Microsoft Windows.

Bundled applications 
Although no software beyond a scanning utility is a feature of any scanner, many scanners come bundled with software. Typically, in addition to the scanning utility, some type of image-editing application (such as Adobe Photoshop), and optical character recognition (OCR) software are supplied. OCR software converts graphical images of text into standard text that can be edited using common word-processing and text-editing software; accuracy is rarely perfect.

Output data 
Some scanners, especially those designed for scanning printed documents, only work in black-and-white but most modern scanners work in color. For the latter, the scanned result is a non-compressed RGB image, which can be transferred to a computer's memory. The color output of different scanners is not the same due to the spectral response of their sensing elements, the nature of their light source and the correction applied by the scanning software. While most image sensors have a linear response, the output values are usually gamma compressed. Some scanners compress and clean up the image using embedded firmware. Once on the computer, the image can be processed with a raster graphics program (such as Adobe Photoshop or the GIMP) and saved on a storage device (such as a hard disk).

Images are usually stored on a hard disk. Pictures are normally stored in image formats such as uncompressed Bitmap, "non-lossy" (lossless) compressed TIFF and PNG, and "lossy" compressed JPEG. Documents are best stored in TIFF or PDF format; JPEG is particularly unsuitable for text. Optical character recognition (OCR) software allows a scanned image of text to be converted into editable text with reasonable accuracy, so long as the text is cleanly printed and in a typeface and size that can be read by the software. OCR capability may be integrated into the scanning software, or the scanned image file can be processed with a separate OCR program.

Document processing

Document imaging requirements differ from those of image scanning. These requirements include scanning speed, automated paper feed, and the ability to automatically scan both the front and the back of a document. On the other hand, image scanning typically requires the ability to handle fragile and or three dimensional objects as well as scan at a much higher resolution.

Document scanners have document feeders, usually larger than those sometimes found on copiers or all-purpose scanners. Scans are made at high speed, from 20 up to 280 or 420 pages per minute, often in grayscale, although many scanners support color. Many scanners can scan both sides of double-sided originals (duplex operation). Sophisticated document scanners have firmware or software that cleans up scans of text as they are produced, eliminating accidental marks and sharpening type; this would be unacceptable for photographic work, where marks cannot reliably be distinguished from desired fine detail. Files created are compressed as they are made.

The resolution used is usually from 150 to 300 dpi, although the hardware may be capable of 600 or higher resolution; this produces images of text good enough to read and for optical character recognition (OCR), without the higher demands on storage space required by higher-resolution images.

Document scans are often processed using OCR technology to create editable and searchable files. Most scanners use ISIS or TWAIN device drivers to scan documents into TIFF format so that the scanned pages can be fed into a document management system that will handle the archiving and retrieval of the scanned pages. Lossy JPEG compression, which is very efficient for pictures, is undesirable for text documents, as slanted straight edges take on a jagged appearance, and solid black (or other color) text on a light background compresses well with lossless compression formats.

While paper feeding and scanning can be done automatically and quickly, preparation and indexing are necessary and require much work by humans. Preparation involves manually inspecting the papers to be scanned and making sure that they are in order, unfolded, without staples or anything else that might jam the scanner. Additionally, some industries such as legal and medical may require documents to have Bates Numbering or some other mark giving a document identification number and date/time of the document scan.

Indexing involves associating relevant keywords to files so that they can be retrieved by content. This process can sometimes be automated to some extent, but it often requires manual labour performed by data-entry clerks. One common practice is the use of barcode-recognition technology: during preparation, barcode sheets with folder names or index information are inserted into the document files, folders, and document groups. Using automatic batch scanning, the documents are saved into appropriate folders, and an index is created for integration into document-management systems.

A specialized form of document scanning is book scanning. Technical difficulties arise from the books usually being bound and sometimes fragile and irreplaceable, but some manufacturers have developed specialized machinery to deal with this. Often special robotic mechanisms are used to automate the page turning and scanning process.

Document camera scanners

Another category of document scanner is the document camera. Capturing images on document cameras differs from that of flatbed and Automatic document feeder (ADF) scanners in that there are no moving parts required to scan the object. Conventionally either the illumination/reflector rod inside the scanner must be moved over the document (such as for a flatbed scanner), or the document must be passed over the rod (such as for feeder scanners) in order to produce a scan of a whole image. Document cameras capture the whole document or object in one step, usually instantly. Typically, documents are placed on a flat surface, usually the office desk, underneath the capture area of the document camera. The process of whole-surface-at-once capturing has the benefit of increasing reaction time for the work flow of scanning. After being captured, the images are usually processed through software which may enhance the image and perform such tasks like automatically rotating, cropping and straightening them.

It is not required that the documents or objects being scanned make contact with the document camera, therefore increasing flexibility of the types of documents which are able to be scanned. Objects which have previously been difficult to scan on conventional scanners are now able to be done so with one device. This includes in particular documents which are of varying sizes and shapes, stapled, in folders or bent/crumpled which may get jammed in a feed scanner. Other objects include books, magazines, receipts, letters, tickets etc. No moving parts can also remove the need for maintenance, a consideration in the Total cost of ownership, which includes the continuing operational costs of scanners.

Increased reaction time whilst scanning also has benefits in the realm of context-scanning. ADF scanners, whilst very fast and very good at batch scanning, also require pre- and post- processing of the documents. Document cameras can be integrated directly into a Workflow or process, for example a teller at a bank. The document is scanned directly in the context of the customer, in which it is to be placed or used. Reaction time is an advantage in these situations. Document cameras usually also require a small amount of space and are often portable.

Whilst scanning with document cameras may have a quick reaction time, large amounts of batch scanning of even, unstapled documents is more efficient with an ADF scanner. There are challenges which face this kind of technology regarding external factors (such as lighting) which may have influence on the scan results. The way in which these issues are resolved strongly depends on the sophistication of the product and how it deals with these issues.

Infrared cleaning 

Infrared cleaning is a technique used to remove the effects of dust and scratches on images scanned from film; many modern scanners incorporate this feature. It works by scanning the film with infrared light; the dyes in typical color film emulsions are transparent to infrared light, but dust and scratches are not, and block infrared; scanner software can use the visible and infrared information to detect scratches and process the image to greatly reduce their visibility, considering their position, size, shape, and surroundings.

Scanner manufacturers usually have their own name attached to this technique. For example, Epson, Minolta, Nikon, Konica Minolta, Microtek, and others use Digital ICE, while Canon uses its own system FARE (Film Automatic Retouching and Enhancement system). Plustek uses LaserSoft Imaging iSRD.  Some independent software developers design infrared cleaning tools.

Other uses
Flatbed scanners have been used as digital backs for large-format cameras to create high-resolution digital images of static subjects. A modified flatbed scanner has been used for documentation and quantification of thin layer chromatograms detected by fluorescence quenching on silica gel layers containing an ultraviolet (UV) indicator. 'ChromImage' is allegedly the first commercial flatbed scanner densitometer. It enables acquisition of TLC plate images and quantification of chromatograms by use of Galaxie-TLC software. Other than being turned into densitometers, flatbed scanners were also turned into colorimeters using different methods. Trichromatic Color Analyser is allegedly the first distributable system using a flatbed scanner as a tristimulus colorimetric device.

See also 
 Barcode reader
 Book scanning
 Cintel telecine equipment
 Display resolution
 Gamma correction
 Imaging
 Telecine

References

External links 

 Photocopy is an open-source software to apply a photocopier effect to scanned images.
 "Is Drum Scanning Really Alive and Well?" from Digital Output by Jim Rich
"Can a Fine-Art Large-Format Photographer Find Happiness With a $30,000 Scanner?" by Bill Glickman

 
Information management
Office equipment
Records management
Records management technology
Italian inventions